Cosmopterix ornithognathosella is a moth in the family Cosmopterigidae. It was described by Wolfram Mey in 1998. It is found on Mindanao in the Philippines.

References

Moths described in 1998
ornithognathosella